Michael Kennedy may refer to:

Entertainment
 Michael J. Kennedy (melodeon player) (1900–1978), Irish-American player of the one-row accordion
 Michael Kennedy (music critic) (1926–2014), British music critic, biographer and musicologist
 Michael Kennedy (director) (born 1954), Canadian TV/film director

Politics
 Michael Kennedy (Newfoundland politician) (1858–1917), Newfoundland politician
 Michael J. Kennedy (1897–1949), American businessman and politician
 Michael K. Kennedy (born 1939), American politician in the state of Iowa
 Michael Kennedy (Dublin politician) (born 1949), Irish Fianna Fail politician from Dublin
 Michael Kennedy (Longford politician) (died 1965), Irish Fianna Fail politician represented Longford-Westmeath
 Mike Kennedy (politician), American state representative in Utah

Sports
 Michael Kennedy (climber), American rock and alpine climber, and past editor of Climbing Magazine
 Michael Kennedy (footballer, born 1964), Australian rules footballer with Carlton and Sydney
 Michael Kennedy (footballer, born 1967), Australian rules footballer with the Brisbane Bears
 Mick Kennedy (Limerick hurler) (1911–1977), Irish hurler for the Limerick senior team
 Mick Kennedy (Offaly hurler), Irish hurler for the Offaly senior team
 Mick Kennedy (born 1961), footballer
 Mike Kennedy (American football) (born 1959), American football player
 Mike Kennedy (baseball), head baseball coach at Elon University
 Mike Kennedy (curler) (born 1962), Canadian curler (from New Brunswick)
 Mike Kennedy (ice hockey, born 1972), Canadian professional ice hockey centre

Other
 Michael John Kennedy, American criminal defense attorney
 Michael LeMoyne Kennedy (1958–1997), son of Robert F. Kennedy

See also
Michael O'Kennedy (1936–2022), Irish Fianna Fáil politician from Tipperary
Mikhail Kennedy (born 1996), Northern Irish footballer